Šuhret Fazlić (born 17 April 1961) is a Bosnian politician, and served as the mayor of Bihać.

Biography
Fazlić attended schools in his hometown of Bihać, then graduated in political sciences from the University of Sarajevo in 1985. Fazlić also obtained a master's degree in human resources management from the University of Business Engineering and Management (Banja Luka) in 2007, and as a recipient of the Hubert Humphrey Fellowship he attended a 1-year human resources management course at Michigan State University.

He worked for the Bihać company Unatrans from 1985 to 1989, then as director of NIRIRO Krajina Bihać, head of the travel agency Unatrans Bihać, head of the commercial and financial sector of Autokomerc Bihać.

During the Bosnian War, Fazlić was a member of the command of the V Corps of the Army of the Republic of Bosnia and Herzegovina and the Military Police Battalion, in charge among others of the exchange of prisoners of war.

In the late 1990s, he worked as a representative in Bihać of the Sarajevo company Jump, directo of Galaxy Bihać, Im-ex Bihać, head of the Labor Inspectorate of Una-Sana Canton, field agent for the World Bank / FBiH employment project for demobilized combatants (PIU PELRP), head of the OHR Office for USC and Canton 10, advisor to the Mayor of Bihać, advisor to Halil Bajramović's company Rad putevi Bihać, advisor to the Prime Minister of the USC. He also served as director of the FBiH Privatization Agency.

From 1998 to 2000, Fazlić was a member of the Una-Sana Cantonal assembly, then from 2000 to 2002 of the Federal House of Representatives. At the local elections in 2008 and 2012 municipal elections, he was elected municipal councilor in Bihać.

At the 2016 municipal elections, as a candidate of the Civic Alliance (Građanski Savez), Fazlić narrowly won the mayoral seat with 8,933 votes against 8,180 for the SDA/SBB candidate and 5,084 for the SDP candidate. Local businessman Halil Bajramović financed half of his electoral campaign. He was strongly re-elected in 2020 as candidate of the POMAK party.

In the general elections in Bosnia and Herzegovina in 2022, Fazlić was elected as a representative in the Assembly of the Una-Sana Canton.

He is married and has two children.

References

External links 
Klix.ba

1961 births
Living people
People from Bihać
Bosniaks of Bosnia and Herzegovina
Bosnia and Herzegovina Muslims
Bosniak politicians